Mate Pavić (born 4 July 1993) is a Croatian professional tennis player who is a former world No. 1 in doubles.

He is a five-time Grand Slam champion, having won three titles in men's doubles: the 2018 Australian Open with Oliver Marach, the 2020 US Open with Bruno Soares, and the 2021 Wimbledon Championships with Nikola Mektić. Pavić also won mixed doubles titles at the 2016 US Open with Laura Siegemund, and the 2018 Australian Open with Gabriela Dabrowski. He finished runner-up at the 2017 Wimbledon Championships, the 2018 French Open and the 2020 French Open in men's doubles, and at the 2018 and 2019 French Opens in mixed doubles.

Pavić has won 33 doubles titles on the ATP Tour, including five at Masters 1000 level. In May 2018, he became world No. 1 in doubles, making him the 52nd player history to hold the top ranking. He was the youngest doubles No. 1 since Todd Woodbridge in 1996, and the first player from Croatia, male or female, to be world No. 1 in singles or doubles. Pavić was part of the winning Croatian team at the 2018 Davis Cup, and also won Olympic gold in men's doubles at the 2020 Summer Olympics alongside Mektić. In singles, he reached a career-high ranking of No. 295 in May 2013.

Early and personal life
Pavić was born in Split, Croatia to Jakov, a tennis coach, and Snježana, a kindergarten teacher. He has two sisters, Nadja and Matea. He started playing tennis at the age of 5, after watching his father coach his sister Nadja. His nickname is Fifty.

Tennis career

Juniors
As a junior Pavić posted a singles win–loss record of 95–51 (90–39 in doubles) and reached a combined ranking of No. 5 in January 2011. In singles, in 2010 he reached the French Open QF and in 2011 again the QF, this time at the Wimbledon Championship. His biggest success as a junior came at the 2011 Wimbledon Championships – Boys' doubles where he won the title partnering George Morgan (UK).

Early career
After winning the Boys' Doubles title at Wimbledon Championship, Pavić received a wild card to the 2012 Zagreb Indoors doubles tournament. Partnering Ivan Dodig, he reached his first ATP doubles finals at the age of 18 years and 7 months. In singles, his first ATP-level tour match came at the 2011 ATP Croatia Open in Umag, where he lost to Filippo Volandri in the first round. His first victory at the ATP-tour level came at 2012 Rosmalen Grass Court Championships in s-Hertogenbosch where he upset world No. 40 Robin Haase in the first round. The same year he defeated world No 37. Juan Carlos Ferrero. The following year he reached his career high ranking in singles at world No. 295.

Pavić wanted to pursue his tennis career in both singles and doubles, but when doubles qualifying events were introduced in 2016, this new rule enabled him to get into bigger ATP doubles tournaments and decided to focus more on doubles. He is quoted saying he regrets not being able to see where his singles career would have taken him.

2015-2017: First doubles title, Grand Slam mixed title and doubles final

Pavić won his first ATP doubles title at ATP Nice Open in May 2015, partnering Michael Venus. From May 2015 to October 2016 Pavić and Venus made it to 11 ATP doubles finals, winning five of them. However, they never made it past 3rd round at a Grand Slam tournament and decide to split at the end of 2016.

The same year Mate went on to win the mixed doubles title with Laura Siegemund. Not being able to secure a permanent partner after the 2017 Miami Open, Pavić temporarily teamed with Austria's doubles veteran Oliver Marach during the European clay court season. Their clay swing was not successful and they decided to split after 2017 Wimbledon Championship. However, Pavić and Marach then made it to three consecutive grass court finals, including the 2017 Wimbledon Championship where they lost 11–13 in the fifth set to (at the time) No. 1 ranked doubles team of Lukasz Kubot and Marcelo Melo.

After reaching the finals at Wimbledon, at the 2017 US Open Pavić and Marach lost in the 3rd round. In October Pavić and Marach won their first tournament as a team at the Stockholm Open. In November they qualified for the 2017 ATP Finals as first alternates and played one match, beating the Bryan brothers in Round robin. Pavić finished the season at no. 17

2018: Grand Slam doubles and mixed doubles titles, Masters 1000 finals, No. 1 ranking

Pavić and Marach had a great start to 2018. They went on to win 17 matches in a row, capturing titles at the Qatar Open, Auckland Open and then winning their first Grand Slam title at the 2018 Australian Open. In Melbourne, Mate also won his second mixed doubles Grand Slam title, this time with Gabriela Dabrowski. Pavić and Marach's winning streak came to an end at the Rotterdam Open in February, where they lost in the final. In April, Pavić and Marach reached their first ATP 1000 Masters Series finals in Monte Carlo (losing to Bryan brothers).

On 21 May 2018, Pavić became the No. 1 ranked player in the world in doubles, and spent 8 weeks at the top. He was the youngest No. 1 doubles player in the world since Todd Woodbridge in 1996. Pavić and Marach also made it to the 2018 French Open final, where they lost to Mahut and Herbert. After the French Open, Pavić and Marach went 10–8, losing in both 2018 Wimbledon Championship and 2018 US Open first rounds. They bounced back by reaching the China Open final in October (l. to Kubot and Melo).  Pavić finished the 2018 season at no. 3.

2019-2020: US Open and Masters 1000 titles, return to top 10, doubles pair race year-end No. 1

After the 2019 French Open, Marach and Pavić terminated their partnership and Mate teamed with Bruno Soares and won his first Masters title at 2019 Shanghai Rolex Masters in October. The same month they reached the final of Stockholm Open, and Pavić briefly returned to top 10 rankings, but finished the 2019 season ranked 18th in the world.

In September 2020 Pavić and Soares won the 2020 US Open tournament. It was the second men's doubles Grand Slam title of Pavić's career. They followed it with a run to the 2020 French Open and 2020 Rolex Paris Masters finals where they lost after having 5 match points. The pair finished No. 1 in the 2020 doubles race.

2021: New partnership, seven ATP & historic Wimbledon titles, return to No. 1, First Croatian Olympic champion

Starting 2021 Pavić partnered successfully with his compatriot Nikola Mektić. They won four ATP titles including the doubles title at the 2021 Miami Open in April and reached the 2021 Australian Open doubles semifinals and 2021 Dubai Tennis Championships final in the first three months of the year. Following these results, Pavić returned to the No. 1 ranking in doubles on April 5. On April 18, Pavić clinched his fifth overall and second ATP Masters title of the year at the 2021 Monte-Carlo Masters, along with retaining the No. 1 ranking, as he was in contention with Robert Farah for it, who lost in the semifinals at the event. Seeded No. 2 the pair also reached the final at the 2021 Mutua Madrid Open Masters where they lost to the No. 3 seeded pair of Horacio Zeballos and Marcel Granollers and the final of the 2021 Italian Open where they won the title defeating No. 5 seeded pair Rajeev Ram and Joe Salisbury.

In their first Grand Slam doubles final, top seeds Pavic and Mektić had the biggest victory of their 2021 season as a team defeating Granollers and Zeballos to triumph in doubles at the 2021 Wimbledon Championships.
They became the first Croatian players to win the Wimbledon men's doubles title. They are also the first players from their country to win at the All England Club since Goran Ivanisevic's 2001 victory in singles and Ivan Dodig's 2019 mixed doubles win with Latisha Chan.

At the Olympics he won the gold medal with Mektić in an all-Croatian final defeating Ivan Dodig and Marin Cilic. It was the country's first gold medal in the sport and the third time in the Olympics men's doubles' history that the same country won both gold and silver, and the first one since 1908.

2022: Second-time Italian Open champion, 30th title, 350th career win, Wimbledon final
Pavić and Mektić won their second Italian Open Masters crown and defended their 2021 title.

In the following week, the Croatian pairing won the 2022 Geneva Open, which was Pavić's 28th doubles title and 30th overall (including the two mixed titles).

In June, Pavić won the Stuttgart Open with Hubert Hurkacz overcoming Tim Puetz and Michael Venus for his 350th win.

In the following week at the ATP 500 2022 Queen's Club Championships, Pavić won his third title for the season in partnership with Mektic and twelfth overall for the pair. The pair also successfully defended their title at the 2022 Eastbourne International, which was Pavić's third consecutive title win.

At the 2022 Wimbledon Championships the Croatian pair reached the semifinals in straight sets  and the final defeating six seeded Columbian pair of Robert Farah and Juan-Sebastian Cabal in a five sets with a fifth set super tiebreak over 4 hours match.

The pair won another ATP 500 title at the 2022 Astana Open making it fifth as a team and sixth overall for the season for Pavic.

Grand Slam tournament finals

Doubles: 7 (3 titles, 4 runner-ups)

Mixed doubles: 4 (2 titles, 2 runner-ups)

Olympic finals

Doubles: 1 (1 Gold medal)

Year-end championships

Doubles: 1 (1 runner-up)

Masters 1000 finals

Doubles: 9 (5 titles, 4 runner-ups)

ATP career finals

Doubles: 62 (33 titles, 29 runner-ups)

Doubles performance timeline

Current through the 2022 Dubai.

References

External links

 
 
 
 2011 Wimbledon report

1993 births
Living people
Croatian male tennis players
Tennis players from Split, Croatia
Wimbledon junior champions
Tennis players at the 2010 Summer Youth Olympics
Grand Slam (tennis) champions in men's doubles
Grand Slam (tennis) champions in mixed doubles
Australian Open (tennis) champions
US Open (tennis) champions
Grand Slam (tennis) champions in boys' doubles
Wimbledon champions
Tennis players at the 2020 Summer Olympics
Olympic tennis players of Croatia
Medalists at the 2020 Summer Olympics
Olympic gold medalists for Croatia
Olympic medalists in tennis
ATP number 1 ranked doubles tennis players
ITF World Champions
21st-century Croatian people